Wurster Nordseeküste is a municipality in the district of Cuxhaven, in Lower Saxony, Germany. It takes its name from the historic region Land Wursten and the North Sea coast. It was formed on 1 January 2015 by the merger of the former municipalities Nordholz, Cappel, Dorum, Midlum, Misselwarden, Mulsum, Padingbüttel and Wremen.

References

Cuxhaven (district)